Pristerodontia is a group of dicynodont therapsids that includes cryptodontids, geikiids, lystrosaurids, kannemeyeriids, and other related forms. Pristerodontians were one of the few groups of dicynodonts to survive the Permian–Triassic extinction event, diversifying in the Triassic.

References

Dicynodonts
Permian synapsids
Triassic synapsids
Lopingian first appearances
Late Triassic extinctions